Karitsa may refer to:

Estonia
Karitsa, Lääne-Viru County, a village in Rakvere Parish, Lääne-Viru County Estonia
Karitsa, Rapla County, a village in Kaiu Parish, Rapla County, Estonia

Greece
Karitsa, Evrytania, a village in the municipality Karpenisi, Evrytania
Karitsa, Ioannina, a village in the municipality Zitsa, Ioannina regional unit
Karitsa, Karditsa, a village in the municipality Lake Plastiras, Karditsa regional unit
Karitsa, Laconia, a village in the municipality Evrotas, Laconia
Karitsa, Larissa, a village in the municipality Agia, Larissa regional unit
Karitsa, Pieria, a village in the municipality Dio-Olympos, Pieria

Russia
Karitsa, Russia, a rural locality (a settlement) in Gryazovetsky District of Vologda Oblast